Paul Malliavin (September 10, 1925 – June 3, 2010) was a French mathematician who made important contributions to harmonic analysis and stochastic analysis. 
He is known for the Malliavin calculus, an infinite dimensional calculus for functionals on the Wiener space and his probabilistic proof of Hörmander's theorem.
He was Professor  at the Pierre and Marie Curie University and a member of the French Academy of Sciences from 1979 to 2010.

Scientific contributions

Malliavin's early work was in harmonic analysis, where he derived important results on the spectral synthesis problem, providing definitive answers to fundamental questions in this field, including a complete characterization of 'band-limited' functions whose Fourier transform has compact support, known as the Beurling-Malliavin theorem.

In stochastic analysis, Malliavin is known for his work on the stochastic calculus of variation, now known as the Malliavin calculus, a mathematical theory which has found many applications in Monte Carlo simulation and mathematical finance.

As stated by Stroock and Yor: "Like Norbert Wiener, Paul Malliavin came to probability theory from harmonic analysis, and, like Wiener, his analytic origins were apparent in everything he did there."
Malliavin introduced a differential operator on Wiener space, now called the Malliavin derivative, and derived an integration by parts formula for Wiener functionals. Using this integration by parts formula, Malliavin initiated a probabilistic approach to Hörmander's theorem for hypo-elliptic operators and gave a condition for the existence of smooth densities for Wiener functionals in terms of their Malliavin covariance matrix.

Selected publications
 La quasi-analyticité généralisée sur un intervalle borné, Annales scientifiques de l’École Normale Supérieure 3e série 72, 1955, pp. 93–110 
 Impossibilité de la synthèse spectrale sur les groupes abéliens non compacts, Publications Mathématiques de l’IHÉS 2, 1959, pp. 61–68
 Calcul symbolique et sous-algèbres de L1(G), Bulletin de la Société Mathématique de France 87, 1959, pp. 181–186, suite, pp. 187–190
 with Lee A. Rubel: On small entire functions of exponential type with given zeros, Bulletin de la Société Mathématique de France 89, 1961, pp. 175–206
 Spectre des fonctions moyenne-périodiques. Totalité d’une suite d’exponentielles sur un segment, Séminaire Lelong. Analyse 3 Exposé No. 11, 1961
 Un théorème taubérien relié aux estimations de valeurs propres, Séminaire Jean Leray, 1962–1963, pp. 224–231
 
 Géométrie riemannienne stochastique, Séminaire Jean Leray 2 Exposé No. 1, 1973–1974
  
 Geometrie differentielle stochastique, Presses de l’Universite de Montreal, 1978
 with Hélène Airault, Leslie Kay, Gérard Letac: Integration and Probability, Springer, 1995
 with H. Airault: Some heat operators on P(Rd), Annales mathématiques Blaise Pascal 3 no. 1, 1996, pp. 1–11
 Stochastic Analysis, Springer, 1997

References

External links

 
1925 births
2010 deaths
20th-century French mathematicians
21st-century French mathematicians
Probability theorists
University of Paris alumni
Members of the French Academy of Sciences
Members of the Royal Swedish Academy of Sciences